Slovenia was represented by Anžej Dežan with the song "Mr Nobody". The song is written by Urša Vlašič and composed by Matjaž Vlašič.

Before Eurovision

EMA 2006 
EMA 2006 was the 11th edition of the Slovenian national final format Evrovizijska Melodija (EMA). The competition was used by RTV Slovenija to select Slovenia's entry for the Eurovision Song Contest 2006 and was broadcast on TVS 1 and online via the broadcaster's website rtvslo.si.

Competing entries 
Artists and composers were able to submit their entries to the broadcaster between 18 September 2005 and 20 November 2005. 107 entries were received by the broadcaster during the submission period. An expert committee consisting of Jaka Pucihar (composer), Rok Lopatič (music producer), Jernej Vene (music editor for Radia Slovenija), Mitja Ciuha (Eurovision expert) and Mario Galunič (television presenter) selected fourteen artists and songs for the competition from the received submissions. The competing artists were announced on 28 November 2005.

Final 
EMA 2006 took place on 29 January 2006 at the RTV Slovenija Studio 1 in Ljubljana, hosted by Janez Škof, Aljoša Ternovšek and Boris Koba. In addition to the performances of the competing entries, 2001 Slovenian Eurovision entrant Nuša Derenda and Alya performed as guests. The combination of points from a five-member jury panel, a public telephone vote and a public SMS vote selected "Plan B" performed by Anžej Dežan as the winner. The jury consisted of Martin Žvelc (music producer), Nataša Assejev (editor for RTV Slovenija), Cole Moretti (singer-songwriter and guitarist, represented Slovenia in 1993 contest as part of 1X Band), Dragan Trivič (musician) and Črt Sojar Voglar (composer).

Controversy 
EMA veteran Saša Lendero won both the telephone and SMS votes while in the end, the jury decided the outcome and Anžej Dežan won the competition, causing much controversy. This was second time in 3 years that voting jury expelled the televoting winner from their votes. In 2004 also Natalija Verboten with "Cry On My Shoulder" had won the public vote, but the jury gave her 0 points. If they had get only 1 point - both, Lendero in 2006 or Verboten in 2004 would have won EMA. Many polemics and discussions were raised after this - people and media wondering if jury did this on purpose. More dispute was caused when accusations were made that "Plan B" was a copy of a song called "Santa Maria" sung by Austrian singer Simone, therefore breaking the contest rules. The European Broadcasting Union, however, did not see it as a copy, and therefore the song was not disqualified.

At Eurovision
In the 2006 contest, Anžej performed the English version of the song, "Mr Nobody". 

Because Slovenia failed to qualify in 2005 Anžej was forced to compete in the Eurovision semi-final, where he performed 3rd, following Bulgaria and preceding Andorra. Slovenia came 16th with 49 points, failing to qualify to the Grand Final.

Voting

Points awarded to Slovenia

Points awarded by Slovenia

References

2006
Countries in the Eurovision Song Contest 2006
Eurovision